Crash! is an album by guitarist Kenny Burrell with organist Brother Jack McDuff's Quartet recorded in 1963 and released on the Prestige label.

Reception

Allmusic awarded the album 4½ stars stating it is "easily recommended to fans of the jazz organ".

Track listing 
 "Grease Monkey" (Jack McDuff) – 3:15 
 "The Breeze and I" (Ernesto Lecuona, Al Stillman) – 7:26 
 "Call It Stormy Monday" (T-Bone Walker) – 4:34 
 "Nica's Dream" (Horace Silver) – 7:58 
 "Love Walked In" (George Gershwin, Ira Gershwin) – 4:58 
 "We'll Be Together Again" (Carl T. Fischer, Frankie Laine) – 3:16

Note
Recorded at Van Gelder Studio in Englewood Cliffs, New Jersey on January 8, 1963 (track 5) and February 26, 1963 (tracks 1-4 & 6)

Personnel 
Kenny Burrell – guitar
Brother Jack McDuff – organ
Harold Vick – tenor saxophone (tracks 1, 2, 4 & 5)
Eric Dixon – flute (track 5)
Joe Dukes – drums
Ray Barretto – percussion (tracks 1, 2, 4 & 5)

References 

Kenny Burrell albums
Jack McDuff albums
1963 albums
Albums produced by Ozzie Cadena
Prestige Records albums